Blue Seed (stylized as BLUE SEED) is a Japanese manga series written and illustrated by Yuzo Takada. The plot is based on the Izumo cycle of Japanese mythology. The main character, Momiji Fujimiya, is a descendant of the mythical . When Japan is menaced by  spawned by Yamata no Orochi, Momiji is intended to be sacrificed to appease the Aragami. She instead, however, becomes a member of the Terrestrial Administration Center (TAC), a secret agency charged with fighting them.

Ashi Productions and Production I.G. created an anime adaptation for broadcast on Japan's TV Tokyo. The anime series ran for 26 episodes, originally airing from October 5, 1994, to March 29, 1995. An original video animation (OVA), Blue Seed 2, was released in three episode between 1996 and 1998. Both the anime and OVA (under the name Blue Seed Beyond) were licensed by ADV Films in the United States until 2009, when the company shut down. They were rescued licensed by Discotek Media for a SDBD release on December 18, 2018.

Plot
Momiji Fujimiya thought she was just an ordinary middle school student. One day, she is confronted on her way to school by a cat-eyed man with blue magatama beads embedded in his hands, who then attempts to kill her. Momiji is confused and terrified by this strange man's sudden desire to kill her; he also refers to her as Kushinada, confusing her even further.  Momiji is saved by the sudden appearance of two government officials, one of whom shoots the man in the arm and sends him fleeing.

Momiji is intrigued as to why she was referred to as "Kushinada".  She discovers that "Kushinada" refers to an ancient princess whose blood holds the power to stop the ancient monsters known as Aragami by sending them to an eternal sleep.  Momiji dismisses the idea that she could be such a person, despite the fact she lives with her mother and grandmother in a shrine in Izumo.  However, she soon changes her mind after vines begin to appear from every crack and opening attempting to capture her as they whisper "Kushinada".

Momiji tries to escape, not knowing that the vines are being employed by a powerful Aragami known as Orochi.  She is saved by the man with the magatamas embedded into his hands, who introduces himself as Mamoru Kusanagi.  He confronts Orochi using Momiji as bait.  The plan fails and the government officials appear again.  They reveal themselves to be members of the Terrestrial Administration Center (TAC for short), and manage to subdue Orochi.  However, with the last of its strength, it makes a final attempt on Kusanagi.

Momiji saves Kusanagi by taking Orochi's blow.  Impaled by the Aragami, instead of dying, she is instead fused with the magatama, more specifically identified as a mitama, which gives Momiji the ability to sense the presence of other Aragami.  The TAC agents explain that they are an organization dedicated to defeating the Aragami, who seek to destroy humanity.  The current Kushinada, Momiji, must aid them because the other Kushinada, Momiji's twin sister, is now dead.  Momiji, wishing to discover more about the twin sister she never knew and also to fulfill her destiny, agrees to join the TAC under the protection of Kusanagi, who wishes to destroy his former masters, the Aragami.

The story becomes increasingly complex with the appearance of Murakumo, a man with eight mitamas who kills any Aragami he comes across for his own personal reasons.  Kusanagi repeatedly attempts to kill Murakumo.  Kaede Kunikida reappears along with a strange energy field in Tokyo, and Murakumo and Kaede's plans soon become clear – they intend to resurrect the god Susanoo and purify the world of humanity's influences, with Kaede acting as the leader of the movement.

There is also a three episode OVA, Blue Seed Beyond, which takes place two years after the end of the TV series. It concerns what seems to be a resurgence of aragami (actually created via biotechnology), and introduces a new character, Valencia Tachibana. Like Kusanagi, she was implanted with a mitama without turning into a full aragami.

Characters
: Momiji is the descendant of the "Kushinada" who actually lives in Izumo where Princess Kushinada lived. An eighth-grade student in middle school, she was unprepared to understand her destiny to battle the Aragami. She becomes a member of the TAC in order to stop the Aragami from destroying humanity and the world.  An ironic twist of fate has Momiji carrying a mitama – an Aragami "soul" – embedded in her chest. At awkward times, Momiji is the recipient of panty shots and jokes about the type of panties she wears.  Her relationship with Kusanagi takes a turn for the better during the shielded town incident, where she finally confesses her love for him, and he in turn tells her to wait for him. , Monica Rial (English, OVA)
: He was given seven mitama with the expressed mission that when he was older, he would protect the Kushinada from harm. He was very close to Kaede, Momiji's twin sister, before her sacrifice in the tunnels of Tokyo. After Kaede's demise he initially goes to Momiji to kill her, in order to rid the world of the Aragami. He comes around, however, in the second episode, and from then on makes it his sole purpose to keep Momiji from harm and eventually falls in love with her. Kusanagi often pokes fun at Momiji's choice of panties just to anger her.  Kusanagi gains his 8th mitama from Momiji when he rescues her from danger in the last few episodes, which gives him the power to fight Murakumo on an even level. , Matt Kelley (English, OVA)
: Daitetsu, or Mr. Kunikida, is the Chief Director of the TAC. When Kaede and Momiji were born, Mr. Kunikida raised Kaede like his own daughter, but he exploited her ability to track down and kill the Aragami. However, when Kaede sacrificed herself, he felt heartbroken. With Momiji in the TAC, Mr. Kunikida decides not to exploit her abilities like he did with Kaede and instead treated her like a normal girl. He usually drives a Citroën XM. 
: Azusa is the science officer and experimental biologist in the TAC. Azusa is rarely on the field due to her research and development background. She constructs biological weapons for the TAC to use against the Aragami. She is a divorced mother of one. 
: A former member of Tokyo Metropolitan Police, Ryoko uses her police instincts to help the TAC. Ryoko uses her standard police issue weapons in conjunction with weapons modified to be used against the Aragami. She is in love with Kunikida. 
: Koume wears a pink jumpsuit, but never acts feminine. She is loud, brash and aggressive due to her stint in the Japan Self-Defense Forces. She was discharged by the SDF and transferred to the TAC as a result of insubordination. Her philosophy is based on the "bigger gun" theory and uses her military mind and muscle to destroy the Aragami. Despite her tough exterior, she is a vulnerable woman who wants to give her love. She has a soft spot for puppies, enjoys playing matchmaker to Momiji and Kusanagi, and at the end of the series, falls in love with co-worker Yaegashi. 
: The stereotypical computer nerd, Yaegashi does computer analogy for the TAC. On off days, he enjoys hentai games on his computer. He also has a program that pinpoints the Aragami's weak points and attacks, but it doubles as a program to predict what animal would appear on Momiji's panties.  He has a love/hate relationship with Koume through most of the series. He later gets engaged to her in the OVA. 
: Sakura spent most of her life training in the United States. She uses Shinto magic and magic seals to stop the Aragami. She often flirts with Kusanagi just to get under the skin of Momiji, but also helps Momiji deal with the Aragami. 
: Kaede is the twin sister of Momiji and Mr. Kunikida's adopted daughter. Her talents were used to detect Aragami for the TAC, but after realizing she was merely a tool and not a person, she sacrificed herself, only to return on the side of the Aragami. It's not well-shown if Kaede was in love with Kusanagi or not. 
: Susano-Oh is an all-powerful god who is the guardian deity of the Aragami. In the legend, Susano-Oh killed the monster Yamata-no-Orochi and married the Princess Kushinada. Kaede and Murakumo awakened him as part of their plan to create a world of nothing but plants. 
: The series' primary antagonist; like Kusanagi, Murakumo was also chosen to protect the Kushinada. Murakumo has embraced the power of the Aragami and plans on unleashing that power against humanity. Murakumo has eight Blue Seeds embedded in his body. 
: Valencia shows up in the OVA. Like Kusanagi, she was implanted with a mitama without turning into a full aragami.

Media

Manga
The manga's complete title is Aokushimitama Blue Seed (碧奇魂ブルーシード). Originally serialized by Takeshobo in Comic Ganma between March 1992 and June 1996, its 17 chapters were also collected into two Japanese Tankōbon volumes.

Anime episode list

Blue Seed

Blue Seed 2

Theme songs
Opening
Carnival Babel by Takada Band (Fumihiko Tachiki and Ami Mimatsu) (remade by Megumi Hayashibara as "CARNIVAL BABEL 2003 VER." also known as "CARNIVAL BABEL REVIVAL")

Ending
Touch and Go!! by Megumi Hayashibara
Life by Megumi Hayashibara (Ep. 26)

Video game
A role-playing video game entitled  was released by Sega for the Sega Saturn on June 23, 1995. It follows an adventure format, and utilizes a card-based battle system. The game's story is not an adaption of either the manga or the TV series, but a set of original episodes set in the same continuity as the TV series. The main cast of the TV series reprised their roles for the battle sequences and introductory cutscene.

The game was one of 12 Sega Saturn games announced when the system was first unveiled at the 1994 Tokyo Toy Show.

On release, Famicom Tsūshin scored the game a 28 out of 40.

References

External links

1992 manga
1994 Japanese television series debuts
1994 anime television series debuts
1995 Japanese television series endings
1996 anime OVAs
ADV Films
Action anime and manga
Ashi Productions
Comedy anime and manga
Discotek Media
Japanese mythology in anime and manga
Production I.G
Science fantasy anime and manga
Shōnen manga
TV Tokyo original programming
Takeshobo manga
Xebec (studio)